The 2007 Women's Oceania Cup was the fifth edition of the women's field hockey tournament. It was held from 11 to 16 September in Buderim.

The tournament served as a qualifier for the 2008 Olympic Games.

New Zealand won the tournament for the first time, defeating Australia 1–0 in the final.

Teams

Results
All times are local (AEST).

Preliminary round

Pool

Fixtures

Classification round

Third and fourth place

Final

Statistics

Final standings

Goalscorers

References

Women's Oceania Cup
Oceania Cup
Oceania Cup
International women's field hockey competitions hosted by Australia
Oceania Cup
Buderim
Sports competitions in Queensland